Sapek may refer to:

 Sapeh, a traditional lute of the Kenyah and Kayan peoples of Indonesia
 Sapeque or Vietnamese cash, coinage historically used in Vietnam